Þórey Edda Elísdóttir (born 30 June 1977 in Reykjavík) is an Icelandic former pole vaulter. Her personal best is 4.60 metres, achieved in July 2004 in Madrid. This is also the current national Icelandic record. At the 2008 Summer Olympics she did not qualify for final with the result 4.15 metres.

Þórey Edda got her university degree in engineering at the University of Iceland.

She stood as a candidate for the Left-Green Movement in the 2003 Icelandic parliamentary election but did not succeed in winning a seat.

Competition record

References

External links

1977 births
Living people
Thorey Elisdottir, Edda
Thorey Elisdottir, Edda
Thorey Elisdottir, Edda

Athletes (track and field) at the 2000 Summer Olympics
Athletes (track and field) at the 2004 Summer Olympics
Athletes (track and field) at the 2008 Summer Olympics